Kathleen Foster Campbell was an Irish-born American poet. She was an early member of the University of Chicago Poetry Club.

Life
Kathleen Foster was born in Larne, Ireland, and her family moved to the United States when she was a child. She attended the University of Chicago to study poetry. Through the newly formed Poetry Club, Campbell became a close friend of Janet Lewis, Elizabeth Madox Roberts and Gladys Campbell.  She married Gladys' brother, Donald Campbell, an attorney. The couple lived in Chicago until Donald Campbell's retirement, when they moved to Carmel, California.

Published work
 1940: Poetry: 'Not Fragments', 'Wake'
 1941: Poetry: Reviews 'The Gap of Brightness' by F. R. Higgins and New Zealand Poems by Eileen Duggan, Androscoggin by Marsden Hartley, Angle of Earth and Sky by David Morton, 'Two Islands', 'Time and Low Tide'
 1949: Poetry: 'Old Letters'.

Footnotes

External links
 Kathleen Foster Campbell Papers. Yale Collection of American Literature, Beinecke Rare Book and Manuscript Library.

20th-century American poets
American women poets
Irish emigrants to the United States (before 1923)
University of Chicago alumni
20th-century American women writers
Year of birth missing
Year of death missing